is a martial arts master and instructor from Haneji, Okinawa, Ryukyu, Japan.

Early life

He began his study of Karate at age 6, eventually expanding his study to include Judo and Kendo. As a teen, he began studying Yamanni ryu (or Yamanni-Chinen ryu) alongside Kiyoshi Nishime, with Chogi Kishaba, the direct student of Masami Chinen, who was the only instructor of the style remaining in Okinawa. Shihan Oshiro is currently 9th Dan in both Shorin-ryu and 8th Dan in Yamanni ryu.

Career

After retiring as a detective in the Okinawan Police Department in 1978, he moved to the USA. 

In the summer of 2019, Oshiro Sensei moved back to live in Okinawa[4]

Ryukyu Bujutsu Kenkyu Doyukai

In 1985 he and Kishaba Sensei founded the RBKD (Ryukyu Bujutsu Kenkyu Doyukai), an organization dedicated to the research and development of Okinawan Martial Arts. He currently teaches in his San Mateo dojo, and holds seminars nationally and internationally.

References
4. http://okic.okinawa/en/archives/news/p2903

External links
 Dojo bio
 Interview 1
 Interview 2

Okinawan kobudoka
Okinawan male karateka
1949 births
Living people
Japanese emigrants to the United States
Ryukyuan people
Shōrin-ryū practitioners